Nizhneye Sergeyevo is a rural locality (a village) in Kichmegnskoye Rural Settlement, Kichmengsko-Gorodetsky District, Vologda Oblast, Russia. The population was 2 as of 2002.

Geography 
Nizhneye Sergeyevo is located 39 km northeast of Kichmengsky Gorodok (the district's administrative centre) by road. Kontiyevo is the nearest rural locality.

References 

Rural localities in Kichmengsko-Gorodetsky District